Muhammad al-Zurqani (1645–1710  CE ) was a Sunni Maliki Islamic scholar.

Name
His full name was Imam Abu-Abd-Allah "Ibn Fujlah"  Muḥammad ibn ʻAbd al-Bāqī al-Azhari al-Zurqānī al-Maliki.

Biography
He was the son of Abd al-Baqi al-Zurqani and is the annotator of al-Mawahib al-Ladunniyyah, and the commentator on the Muwatta`.

Works
Sharh al-Muwatta al-Malik (al-Zurqani)
Sharh al-Mawahib al-Ladunniyyah
Mukhtaṣar al-maqāṣid al-ḥasanah fī bayān kathīr min al-aḥādīth al-mushtaharah ʻalá al-alsinah/taʾlīf Muḥammad ibn ʻAbd al-Bāqī al-Zurqānī.
taḥqīq Muḥammad ibn Luṭfī al-Ṣabbāgh.
commentaries of al-Bayquniyya, Al-Manzumah of al-Baiquni, which was expanded upon by, amongst others, al-Zurqani.

See also
 List of Islamic scholars
 List of Ash'aris and Maturidis

References

Asharis
Maliki fiqh scholars
1645 births
1710 deaths